Hans Bernd Gisevius (14 July 1904 – 23 February 1974) was a German diplomat and intelligence officer during the Second World War. A covert opponent of the Nazi regime, he served as a liaison in Zürich between Allen Dulles, station chief for the American OSS, and the German Resistance forces in Germany.

Pre Second World War
Gisevius was born in Arnsberg in the Prussian Province of Westphalia. After law school, he joined the Prussian Interior Ministry in 1933 and was assigned to the newly formed Geheime Staatspolizei, or Gestapo. After joining the Gestapo, he immediately had disagreements with his senior, Rudolf Diels, and was discharged. He continued with police work in the Interior Ministry. When Heinrich Himmler took over Police functions in 1936 in the German Reich, he removed Gisevius from office.

Throughout his time working for the Gestapo, Gisevius described himself as living in constant fear, entering and exiting through the back door, clutching a pistol at his side – all resultant from his misgivings with the terror apparatus to which he was assigned, since according to him, it was like "living in a den of murderers". Gisevius later transferred to the Reich Ministry of the Interior. Although he had no position of power, he maintained connections, notably to Arthur Nebe, that kept him informed of the political background. Gisevius joined the secret opposition to Adolf Hitler, began gathering evidence of Nazi crimes (for use in a later prosecution) and attempted to restrain the increasing power of  Himmler and the SS. He maintained links with Hans Oster and Hjalmar Schacht.

Second World War

When the Second World War started, Gisevius joined the German intelligence service, the Abwehr, which was headed by Admiral Wilhelm Canaris, who was secretly an opponent of Hitler. Canaris had surrounded himself with Wehrmacht officers opposed to Hitler and he welcomed Gisevius into this group. Working from the consulate in Zürich, Hans Gisevius was involved in secret talks with the Vatican. Canaris arranged for appointment of Gisevius as Vice Consul in Switzerland, where Gisevius met with Allen Dulles in 1943 and agreed to serve as a liaison for the German opposition to Hitler, an assembly which counted among its members General Ludwig Beck, Abwehr Chief Canaris, and Mayor Carl Goerdeler of Leipzig. Several members of the conspiratorial circle against Hitler including Gisevius, "all kept homes within easy walking distance of each other." According to Gisevius, the original plot to kill Hitler earlier (namely, before the acquiescence of Great Britain over the Sudetenland) was utterly derailed by Neville Chamberlain whose actions he claims "saved Hitler."

Upon returning to Germany, he was investigated by the Gestapo, but released. In 1944, after the failed 20 July assassination attempt against Hitler, Gisevius first hid at the home of his future wife, the Swiss national Gerda Woog, and fled to Switzerland in 1945, making him one of the few conspirators to survive the war. There, he contacted the Swiss authorities.

Peter Hoffmann's biography of Hitler assassination conspirator Claus von Stauffenberg ("Stauffenberg, A Family History," 1992) indicates that after the failure of Stauffenberg's bomb plot in July 1944, Gisevius went into hiding until 23 January 1945, when he escaped to Switzerland by using a passport that had belonged to Carl Deichmann, a brother-in-law of German Count Helmuth James von Moltke, who was a specialist in international law serving in the legal branch of the Foreign Countries Group of the OKW (Oberkommando der Wehrmacht, "Supreme Command of the Armed Forces").  Through the help of the American Allen Dulles in Berne, Switzerland and of the German Legation (in Berne)'s Georg Federer, the passport was modified and a visa obtained for Gisevius that enabled him to escape to Spain.

Later life
Gisevius served as a key witness for the defence at the Nuremberg trials when he was called as a witness by defendants Hjalmar Schacht and Wilhelm Frick. His testimony was crucial in securing the acquittal of Schacht on all counts, but Frick was found guilty and executed. His testimony was also particularly damaging to Hermann Göring, Wilhelm Keitel and Ernst Kaltenbrunner, who were all convicted and sentenced to death.

His autobiography, Bis zum bitteren Ende ("To the Bitter End"), published by Wasmuth in 1948, offered a sharp indictment of both the Nazi regime, many of whose leading members Gisevius knew personally, and the German people. Gisevius claimed that the latter pretended not to know about the atrocities being committed in their name. At the same time, the book also offers an insider's account of the German resistance movement.

In 1946, Gisevius was charged and acquitted by the Swiss authorities in a trial for espionage. Gisevius was later criticised as he diminished the contributions of other members (such as Claus Schenk Graf von Stauffenberg) of the opposition to Hitler. Gisevius wrote in his 1948 book that he considered SS Chief Himmler somewhat of a hypocrite whereas he saw Reinhard Heydrich as one who epitomised Nazi ideals. In the early 1950s, he moved to the United States and lived in Dallas, Texas, but soon returned and lived in Switzerland. Gisevius died in Müllheim in Baden-Württemberg in 1974.

Works
 (Translated in English editions as 'To the Bitter End', and more recently republished in English as "Valkyrie" to capitalize on the film of the same name)
 (The title means Where is Nebe?, Nebe being Arthur Nebe)

Notes

References
 Blandford, Edmund L. SS Intelligence: The Nazi Secret Service. Edison, NJ: Castle, 2001.
 Conot, Robert E. Justice at Nuremberg. New York: Carroll & Graf Publishers Inc., 1993.
 Gisevius, Hans Bernd. To the Bitter End. London: Jonathan Cape Publishing, 1948.
 Gisiger C. Ein sensationeller Prozess? Das militärgerichtliche Strafverfahren gegen Eduard von der Heydt, Hans Bernd Gisevius und Josef Steegman vor dem Divisionsgericht 6 (1946–1948). Historisches Seminar University Zürich, October 2005.
 Kitchen, Martin. Nazi Germany at War. London & New York: Routledge, 1994.
 Guido Knopp. Hitler's Warriors – Episode 6: Canaris – The Master Spy (ZDF/History Channel documentary, 2005)
 Reitlinger, Gerald. The SS: Alibi of a Nation, 1922–1945. New York: Da Capo Press, 1989.
 Giebeler, Marcus: Die Kontroverse um den Reichstagsbrand. Quellenprobleme und historiographische Paradigmen. Martin Meidenbauer, München 2010,  (mit Kurzbiographie zu Gisevius, S. 272–274)
 Wildt, Michael: Generation des Unbedingten. Das Führungskorps des Reichssicherheitshauptamtes. Hamburger Edition, Hamburg 2003,  (zugleich Habilitationsschrift, Universität Hannover 2001)

1904 births
1974 deaths
Abwehr personnel of World War II
German military personnel of World War II
Members of the 20 July plot
People from Arnsberg
People from the Province of Westphalia
People of the Office of Strategic Services
World War II espionage
Gestapo personnel
Nazi Party members